Lekim is both a given name and a surname. Notable people with the name include:

Lekim Ibragimov (born 1944), Uzbekistani graphic artist and academician 
Félicien Lekim (1883–1916), French gymnast